Timothy Steven Harrer (born May 10, 1957) is an American former professional ice hockey player who played three National Hockey League games for the Calgary Flames during the 1982–83 season. Harrer was drafted both by the Atlanta Flames in the ninth round, 148th overall in the 1977 NHL Entry Draft and by the Calgary Cowboys in the ninth round, 78th overall in the 1977 WHA Amateur Draft. He played Right Wing for Minnesota Golden Gophers men's ice hockey team from 1976 to 1980.

In the 2004 film Miracle, which tells the story of the "Miracle on Ice" game at the 1980 Winter Olympics, Harrer is portrayed by Adam Knight.

Awards and honors

References

External links

1957 births
Living people
AHCA Division I men's ice hockey All-Americans
American men's ice hockey right wingers
Atlanta Flames draft picks
Birmingham Bulls (CHL) players
Calgary Cowboys draft picks
Calgary Flames players
Colorado Flames players
EC Graz players
Hershey Bears players
Ice hockey players from Minnesota
Minnesota Golden Gophers men's ice hockey players
NCAA men's ice hockey national champions
Nova Scotia Oilers players
Oklahoma City Stars players
Salt Lake Golden Eagles (CHL) players
Sportspeople from Bloomington, Minnesota
Toledo Goaldiggers players